The eighteenth series of the British consumer technology television programme The Gadget Show began on 14 October 2013 and ended on 6 January 2014. It comprises 13 episodes.

Jason Bradbury, Pollyanna Woodward, Rachel Riley and Jon Bentley all returned from the previous series to present the show.

Episodes

References

2013 British television seasons
2014 British television seasons